Sosnovaya Roshcha is a rural locality (a village) in Kadnikov, Sokolsky District, Vologda Oblast, Russia. The population was 377 as of 2002.

Geography 
The distance to Sokol is 13 km, to Kadnikov is 1 km. Kadnikov is the nearest rural locality.

References 

Rural localities in Sokolsky District, Vologda Oblast